Australian rules football in Western Australia (WA) is the most popular sport in the state and Western Australia has the second highest number of Australian rules football participants of any state. The sport in Western Australia is governed by the West Australian Football Commission (WAFC).

The Colony of Western Australia was the last to take up Australian rules in 1881, nevertheless within less than a decade it had overtaken rugby union there as the most popular football code. Following the Federation of Australia, courtesy of pioneering junior and schools programs the sport grew faster there than any other state. For much of the 20th Century the West Australian Football League was the third strongest state competition in the country. In 1967 the WAFL set a record season attendance of 960,169 and the 1981 WAFL Grand Final was attended by 55,517. While it is now a feeder competition for the more popular Australian Football League, the semi-professional WAFL still attracts around 200,000 fans through the gates each year. 

The state team (the "Sandgropers") has defeated every state including Victoria and were declared national champions in 1921, 1961 and 1979 (the second most national titles after Victoria) and underage national champions in 1999, 2007 and 2019. 

The state is home to two fully professional clubs both owned by the WA Football Commission: West Coast Eagles (1986) and Fremantle Football Club (1994), the former having the distinction of being the first non-Victorian team to compete in and win an AFL Grand Final in 1992. In 2021 it also had the highest membership of any club in the AFL. The combined membership of these two clubs is more than 150,000, making Western Australia second only to Victoria in terms of support for the national club competition. These two teams compete against each other in the Western Derby.

Three West Australians have been named Australian Football Hall of Fame legends: Graham 'Polly' Farmer, Barry Cable and Merv McIntosh. Lance Franklin holds the AFL games and goals records for a Western Australian, with 338 and 1045 respectively. Kiara Bowers is arguably the state's greatest female player being four time All-Australian and the first to win the AFL Women's best and fairest. In the AFL Women's competition Gemma Houghton has kicked the most goals, while Emma King has played the most games.

History

Early Beginnings: 1881-1884
Prior to establishment of the code in the colony, rugby union was the most popular football club, with several clubs playing in organised competitions. Rugby had been organised in the colony as early as the 1860s and Australian rules football was barely heard of in the colony. 

It was mainly cricketers who agitated for the formation of more football clubs for Perth and Geraldton from 1880 to keep them fit in the off-season however rugby was still seen as the default choice. Despite this the first Australian rules club, Unions Football Club formed by former Victorians, emerged in Perth between 1881 and 1882. At the time there were already 3 rugby clubs in Perth and the code was still growing rapidly in the colony, though details of the Unions club's activity in this early period are scant. On March 30, 1883 N. A. ("Bill") Bateman and H. Herbert formed The Swans Football Club in Fremantle, the start of a long inter-city football rivalry.

Perth clubs switch from rugby: 1885
By the mid 1880s the Western Australian media reported a growing dissatisfaction with rugby as a spectacle, particularly its emphasis on playing the body playing the ball.

In 1885 one of the leading rugby clubs, Fremantle, after a meeting at the Cleopatra Hotel, decided to change to Australian Rules. It was quickly joined by three other clubs - , Victorians, and a team of schoolboys from The High School. The schoolboy side lasted just two matches, but the three other sides went on to contest what in retrospect was viewed as the first ever official Western Australian Football Association (WAFA) premiership, won by Rovers. 

However, in those days many young men of Perth's wealthier families were educated in Adelaide, the capital of South Australia. On returning home from there they naturally wished to play the sport they'd grown up with and no doubt exerted some influence on their less affluent peers as to such.

Football spreads to the goldfields 1886-1890s
From 1886 Western Australia was swept up During the 1880s, the discoveries of gold, firstly in the Kimberley, Pilbara and Murchison regions, led to a dramatic increase in WA's population, including many players and supporters of Australian Rules from the eastern colonies.

Progress of Australian Rules in Western Australia still lagged behind the big football cities of Melbourne, Adelaide and Geelong however and is evidenced by the unstable nature of the clubs that participated in the early years.

In 1886 a new club Fremantle based club Unions joined.

In 1887 Fremantle left the WAFA and the West Australian Football Club joined but they would only play two seasons before they disappeared.

Australian rules booms: 1890s

In 1890 Unions would rename themselves Fremantle as those involved in the game saw the need to identify themselves with the region they were located in.

1891 saw two new clubs arrive, Centrals and East Perth, but they would be gone after one and two seasons respectively.

1899 would be the last season Fremantle would take part. Despite Unions/Fremantle being the most dominant club in the WAFA up to this point winning the competition 10 times in its 13 years of existence, problems with debt saw the club disappear and some people involved with the old entity formed South Fremantle Football Club in its place. Despite the fact that many involved with Fremantle moved onto South Fremantle the new club is not seen as a continuation of the old and did not lay claim to its proud records to that date.

1899 was also the last time Rovers would take part. The move to regionalisation which saw Unions take on the old Fremantle's name and colours made it difficult for this club that didn't represent a particular area to attract players. They folded and were immediately replaced by Perth Football Club who were promoted from the Perth First Rate Association.

Major gold discoveries at Coolgardie and Kalgoorlie, coupled with a major international economic depression, caused immigration from the eastern colonies to accelerate. These migrants included a large number of footballers including some celebrated players, and the Goldfields competition (later known as the Goldfields Football League) was comparable in status and standard to the Perth competition for many years. (This was shown by the fact that it had a separate seat on the Australian National Football Council until 1919.) The higher standard of play that naturally followed, helped to increase the game's popularity and increased the professionalism of the WAFA.

By 1901, the WAFA had grown to have six teams. Up to this point, five sides at most had been in the competition, and this number had invariably changed from year to year, as clubs came and went. And by 1906 there were eight teams — being West Perth, East Perth, East Fremantle, South Fremantle, North Fremantle, Subiaco, Perth and Midland Junction.

In 1908 the WAFA was renamed the West Australian Football League (WAFL). West Australia sent a team to the 1908 Melbourne Carnival, over half of the team was from the goldfields league. Its success at the tournament including its defeat of South Australia and appearance in the final against Victoria captured the West Australian public and ushered in an era of immense growth for the code.

World War I and the WAFL's Youth Policy

Jack Simons (WAFL secretary between 1905 and 1914) believed that the future of the code was its introduction to schools. Senior player numbers were already beginning to wane and junior teams were suffering catastrophic loss of numbers. Simons believed the league could not continue without a younger generation. Simons was concerned with encroachment of soccer, rugby and other "non-Australian" sports was threatening the game at grassroots level. Along with several prominent Western Australians including Lionel Boas, Simons formed the Young Australia Football League in 1905 as a development organisation. Confident that Australian Football offered the greatest game in the world, his work included overseas tours and invitational teams. These initiatives would lead to the game's establishment in the schools and provide a boom in junior player numbers which would see competition continue through the war and a generation of new players introduced to the game.

Unlike many other sporting competitions, the WAFL didn't go into recess during World War I, although two teams — North Fremantle and Midland Junction — were "casualties" of the war, competing for the last time in 1915 and 1917 respectively.

Between the Wars

In 1921, Western Australia hosted the first national carnival, known as the 1921 Perth Carnival it went on to win all of its matches to take the title from Victoria.
In 1921, the WAFL introduced the Sandover Medal, for the fairest and best player over a season, as voted by the field umpires. The medal has been awarded annually ever since.

Claremont entered the league in 1926, bringing the number of teams back to seven.

In 1932, the WAFL was renamed the Western Australian National Football League (WANFL) - the "national" concept in the name being adopted by the SANFL and a couple of other leagues a few years earlier.

Swan Districts entered the league in 1934. The eight competing sides still remain today and are generally referred to as the "traditional eight clubs".

Despite WA's poineering efforts in junior development early in the century, by the 1930s the game had all but disappeared from the public school system and a lack of juniors was beginning to hurt the senior leagues, in response the WAFL re-commenced a junior development program.

Because of World War Two, the league only ran an "under age" competition between 1942–44. However, the three premierships won during this time are given equal status to any other, in official records. All clubs competed, with the exception of Swan Districts who could not form a team in 1942, although they were back in 1943.

Post-war period

The 1960s saw crowds get bigger and bigger, as WAFL football captured the hearts and minds of the WA public like never before, and in the 1970s and early 80s it was easily the biggest show in town.

However, during this period more and more star WAFL players were looking to head to the Victorian Football League (VFL), enticed by the bigger money and the fact that it was more and more gaining a reputation as the "big" league.

This is perhaps best evidenced in that Victoria (i.e. the VFL representative team) had by far the best record in interstate games for a long time. But in 1977, when the first proper State of Origin match was played, it saw Western Australia inflict its biggest defeat on a Victorian team.

In 1980, the WANFL dropped the "N" and the "ern" and reverted to being called the WAFL.

At this time crowds were as big as they ever were. Soon afterwards, however, interest in the WAFL began a slow decline, as it became increasingly obvious that even larger numbers of the WAFL's best players were going to head east.

Entering the National Competition
By 1987, the WAFL had decided that the future of the game in WA depended on it entering a team in the VFL. The West Coast Eagles were formed and entered the VFL (the VFL was renamed the AFL in 1990). With many of Western Australia's best players now competing in a team that represented Western Australia on a national scale, it was suddenly apparent that the WAFL was now a second-class competition.

In 1990 the state league was renamed the Western Australian State Football League, but it had reverted to WAFL by 1991.

In 1992, the West Coast Eagles made history by becoming the first interstate club to win an AFL premiership. The win resulted in a huge boost to the side's popularity, put pressure on Subiaco Oval to expand and ultimately led to demand for a second AFL licence for the state.

Another locally based AFL team, the Fremantle FC were formed in 1995.

The popularity of the AFL with 2 sides, particularly with the Western Derby, cemented the position of WAFL as a second-class competition. WAFL clubs have struggled ever since with their sudden demise from being technically equal to any VFL club, to feeder club status. However, they have enjoyed some benefits, such as the funds flowing from the WA-based AFL teams and the influx of talented players from other states, attempting to make a name for themselves.

In 1997, Peel Thunder — somewhat controversially — became the ninth WAFL club. Throughout their brief history, they have struggled to compete with the traditional eight clubs, which are generally opposed to their presence. This is partly because having an odd number of teams forces one team to have a bye each week.

Also in 1997, the WAFL was renamed Westar Rules, in a failed attempt to revamp the league's image. However the name again reverted to WAFL in 2001.

Recent years have seen the WAFL stabilise itself as a league a step down from the AFL. Obviously the sudden player drain brought on by the expansion of the VFL into the AFL has lessened the standard of play, however this has recovered somewhat, with "veteran" AFL players returning and new players coming through.

Recent History

Western Australia was the first state to trial the derivative social game of Rec Footy in 2003.

Involvement and attendance in Australian Rules reached record levels in Western Australia 2004. The total attendance, including AFL games was a record 1,030,000. The 2005 WAFL grand final between South Fremantle and Claremont attracted 22,570 to Subiaco Oval.

In 2006, the combined membership of Fremantle and West Coast AFL clubs was a record 79,804 members.

Participation
In 2022 there were 94,318 registered players. This grew from 2007 when there were around 12,050 senior players and a total participation of 91,009, With a participation rate of around 4.2% per capita, Western Australia  it the third most supported state (behind Victoria and South Australia).

Audience

Attendance Record
 59,608 (2018). AFL Preliminary Final. West Coast Eagles v Melbourne.  (Optus Stadium, Perth)

Major Australian Rules Events in Western Australia
Australian Football League Premiership Season (West Coast Eagles and Fremantle home games)
Western Derby
West Australian Football League Grand Final

Representative teams

The Western Australian Australian football team is nicknamed alternatively the "Sandgropers" or the "Black Swans" and have played representative matches, either as State of Origin or as a state team representing the WAFL against all other Australian states.

Governing Body
The governing body for Australian rules football in WA is the West Australian Football Commission.

Leagues & clubs

Professional clubs
West Coast Eagles (Australian Football League)
Fremantle Football Club (Australian Football League)

Open

Perth metropolitan leagues
West Australian Football League (semi-professional)
Western Australian Amateur Football League
Metro Football League (was Mercantile Football Association)
Sunday Football League (defunct)

Regional leagues
West Australian Country Football League
Avon Football Association
Central Kimberley Football Association
Central Midlands Coastal Football League
Central Wheatbelt Football League
East Kimberley Football Association
Eastern Districts Football League
Esperance District Football Association
Fortescue National Football League
Gascoyne Football Association
Goldfields Football League
Great Northern Football League
Great Southern Football League
Hills Football Association
Lower South West Football League
Mortlock Football League
Newman National Football League
North Midlands Football League
North Pilbara Football League
Ongerup Football Association
Peel Football League
Ravensthorpe & Districts Football Association
South West Football League
Upper Great Southern Football League
West Kimberley Football Association

Women's
 West Australian Women's Football League Official Site

Masters
Masters Australian Football WA Official Site

Principal Venues
The following venues meet AFL Standard criteria and have been used to host AFL (National Standard) or AFLW level matches (Regional Standard) are listed by capacity.

Historic Venues
 Subiaco Oval (1930s-2017)
 WACA Ground (1899-2000)

Modern AFL Standard Venues
 Perth Stadium (2018-)
 Fremantle Oval (1890s-)
 Arena Joondalup
 Leederville Oval
 East Fremantle Oval
 Claremont Oval
 Bassendean Oval
 Lathlain Park
 Rushton Park
 Wonthella Oval, Geraldton
 Collingwood Park, Albany
 Centennial Stadium, Albany

Players

All-time Greats

Graham 'Polly' Farmer was the first West Australian to be inducted into the Australian Football Hall of Fame as a legend. He was also named as the ruckman in the AFL Team of the Century. Barry Cable (2012) and Merv McIntosh (2021) have also been elevated to legend status.

Other great players from WA to have been inducted into the Australian Football Hall of Fame are Jack Clarke, George Doig, Ross Glendinning, Denis Marshall, Merv McIntosh, Stephen Michael, George Moloney, Graham Moss, Wayne Richardson, Jack Sheedy, William 'Nipper' Truscott and Bill Walker. 

Retired modern greats include Brad Hardie, Nicky Winmar, Jim and Phil Krakouer, Mark Bairstow, Glen Jakovich, Guy McKenna, Dean Kemp, Peter Matera, Ben Cousins, Simon Black, Patrick Ryder, Peter Bell, Jeff Farmer, Aaron Sandilands, Dean Cox and Daniel Kerr.

Men's

Current men's AFL players include Lance Franklin, Nat Fyfe, Patrick Cripps, Nic Naitanui,  Brandon Starcevich, Liam Baker, Daniel Rich, Shai Bolton, Tom Barrass, Brad Sheppard, Jeremy McGovern, Jaeger O'Meara, Mitch Duncan, Jack Darling, Aaron Naughton, Luke Ryan, Tim English, Blake Acres and Dom Sheed.

Women's
Fremantle was the first professional women's team in the state in 2017, therefore the majority of the professional players have played there, the West Coast women's team was not awarded a license until 2020. Due to the large distance to the eastern states, most West Australian female players are drafted to one of these two teams.

See also
West Australian Football League
Australian Football League
West Coast Eagles
Fremantle Football Club
List of Australian rules football leagues in Western Australia
Australian rules football in the Goldfields region of Western Australia
West Australian State Championship

References

External links
Western Australia Team of the Century (from Full Points Footy)

 
West
History of Australian rules football